is a city in Miyagi Prefecture, Japan. , the city had an estimated population of 33,330 and a population density of 120 persons per km2 in 14,242 households.

Geography
Shiroishi is in southern Miyagi Prefecture, in the Tōhoku region of northern Japan, bordered by Fukushima Prefecture to the south. The southern peak of Mount Zaō is within the city borders.

Neighboring municipalities
Miyagi Prefecture
Kakuda
Shichikashuku
Zaō
Ōgawara
Marumori
Fukushima Prefecture
Fukushima
Date
Kunimi
Koori

Climate
Shiroishi has a humid climate (Köppen climate classification Cfa) characterized by mild summers and cold winters.

Demographics
Per Japanese census data, the population of Shiroishi peaked around the year 1990 and has declined since.

History
The area of present-day Shiroishi was part of ancient Mutsu Province and was under control of the Date clan of Sendai Domain during the Edo period, under the Tokugawa shogunate. During the Boshin War of the Meiji Restoration, Shiroishi Castle was the site of a battle between the pro-imperial and pro-Tokugawa forces of the Ōuetsu Reppan Dōmei. After the end of the Boshin War, the Nambu clan of Morioka Domain was briefly relocated to a reduced domain centered on Shiroishi by the Meiji government.

The town of Shiroishi was established on June 1, 1889 with the establishment of the post-Meiji restoration modern municipalities system. The villages of Odaira, Otakasawa, Kosugo, Saikawa, Shirakawa and Fukuoka merged with Shiroishi on April 1, 1954, which was then raised to city status. The village of Obara was annexed to Shiroishi on March 31, 1957.

Government
Shiroishi has a mayor-council form of government with a directly elected mayor and a unicameral city legislature of 18 members. Shiroishi, collectively with the towns of Zaō and Shichikashuku, contributes two seats to the Miyagi Prefectural legislature. In terms of national politics, the city is part of Miyagi 3rd district of the lower house of the Diet of Japan.

Economy
Shiroishi has a mixed economy, dominated by light manufacturing of electronics, automotive components and food processing. Agriculture is dominated by rice cultivation on the flatlands and horticulture in more hilly areas.

Education
Shiroishi has nine public elementary schools and five public junior high schools operated by the city government and two public high schools operated by the Miyagi Prefectural Board of Education. The prefecture also operates two special education schools.

Transportation

Railway
 East Japan Railway Company (JR East) - Tōhoku Shinkansen

 East Japan Railway Company (JR East) - Tōhoku Main Line
  -  -  -

Highways
 - Shiroishi IC

Local attractions
 Shiroishi Castle: restored in 1995 after its destruction in 1875. The castle has also become a tourist spot for "contents tourism" related to the video game  Sengoku BASARA2.
 Miyagi Zao Fox Village: Filled with real wild foxes

Sister city relations
 – (formerly) Hurstville, New South Wales, Australia. The sister city relationship has been discontinued following the council amalgamations of Hurstville and Kogarah to form the merged Georges River Council.
 – Noboribetsu, Hokkaido, Japan 
 – Ebina, Kanagawa, Japan

Noted people from Shiroishi 
Ōzutsu Man'emon – sumo wrestler
Tetsuya Endo, Japanese professional wrestler

References

External links

Official Website 

 
Cities in Miyagi Prefecture